Schinia grandimedia, the Rockies boneset flower moth, is a moth of the family Noctuidae. The species was first described by David F. Hardwick in 1996. It is found in the United States from Kansas to Texas, west to Colorado and New Mexico.

The wingspan is 26–27 mm. There is one generation per year.

Larvae have been recorded on Brickellia eupatorioides var. corymbulosa and var. chlorolepis.

External links

Moths of Southeastern Arizona. Image.

Schinia
Moths of North America
Moths described in 1996